Today Is Our Valentine's Day is the third live album of Fish Leong (Chinese: 梁静茹), released on 28 August 2008.

Track listing
 今天情人節
 如果能在一起
 我們就到這
 我決定 - Wo Jue Ding
 昨日情書 (A medley song of: Jody Chiang's Speechless Flower, Faye Wong's Red Bean, A-Mei and JJ Lin's Remember and Jacky Cheung's Love Letters) 
 崇拜
 會呼吸的痛
 知足 (Original artist: Mayday)
 愛很簡單 (Original artist: David Tao)
 誘惑的街 (Original artist: Sandy Lam)
 夢醒時分 (Original artist: Sarah Chen)
 C'est La Vie
 Let's Fall In Love (Original artist: Karen Mok)
 滿滿的都是愛

Fish Leong albums
2008 albums
Mandopop albums
Rock Records albums